Mullins Prairie is an unincorporated community in eastern Fayette County, Texas, United States.

External links
 MULLINS PRAIRIE, TX Handbook of Texas Online.

Unincorporated communities in Fayette County, Texas
Unincorporated communities in Texas